goTenna (goTenna Inc.) is a Brooklyn, New York-based startup that designs and develops professional mesh networking technologies for off-grid and decentralized communications. goTenna devices pair with smartphones and, through intelligent mobile ad hoc networking protocols, enable users to send texts and share locations on a peer-to-peer basis, foregoing the need for centralized communications infrastructure of any kind.

History

The idea for goTenna came about after Hurricane Sandy knocked out 25 percent of cell towers, and caused outages for 25 percent of Internet services, across 10 states on the East Coast. Officially incorporated in April 2013, the company's stated goal is to build "people-powered peer-to-peer communication systems" reducing our reliance on cell towers and wifi routers, and providing anyone the ability to create a network on their terms. In 2014, goTenna rolled out its first consumer product, the goTenna, a pocket-size communication tool that lets off-grid travelers talk to one another without cell service. 

In September 2016, goTenna launched goTenna Plus, a, subscription-based upgrade to the goTenna applications, which includes the capability to use other goTenna users as gateways to relay messages through to traditional SMS networks. The company also released its software development kit, enabling developers to create new applications using goTenna hardware. However, its license does not permit use with open source copyleft licenses. Around the same time, goTenna unveiled a second-generation device: goTenna Mesh, the first consumer-ready mesh network of its kind, available to 49 countries.

goTenna Pro 
In March 2017, the company announced its goTenna Pro line, for professional mobile radio communications needs, shifting its focus from consumer tech to filling the needs of public sector clients. To finance its expansion of operations, the company raised $24M in Series C equity and debt funding in 2019, led by Founders Fund with participation from Comcast Ventures and existing investors Union Square Ventures, Collaborative Fund, Walden VC, MentorTech, and Bloomberg Beta. 

In 2022, goTenna secured a $22.3M funded, $24.9M ceiling SBIR Phase III contract with U.S. Customs and Border Protection (CBP) to support the deployment of hardware, training, as well as development to expand the Agent Visualization Program (AVP), a program designed to improve the safety and effectiveness of law enforcement officers by providing comprehensive situational awareness in the border enforcement zone.

In February of 2023, goTenna was awarded a Small Business Innovation Research (SBIR) Phase II contract to provide mission-critical communication network monitoring and analysis platform for the United States Air Force (USAF).

Products 

 goTenna Pro X
 goTenna Pro X2
 goTenna Pro Deployment Kit 
 goTenna Pro Deployment Kit 2
 goTenna SDK
 TAK
 goTenna Pro App
 goTenna Mesh

Awards
 CES Innovation Award 2017: Tech for a Better World
 CES Innovation Award 2017: Wireless Accessory
 Industrial Designers Society of America – IDEA 2016 Gold
 Edison Awards Gold – Innovative Services
 CES Innovation Award 2015: Tech for a Better World
 CES Innovation Award 2015: Wireless Accessory
 Fast Company 2015 Innovation by Design
 Core77 2015 Design Awards
 NAVWAR Project Overmatch: Networks Prize Challenge
 AFWERX SBIR 203-CSO1-Phase I 
 NSF SBIR Phase I
 AFWERX SBIR Phase II

References

External links

goTenna Pro official website

Networking hardware companies
Radio technology
Radio electronics
Peer-to-peer
Telecommunications companies of the United States
Companies based in New York City
Companies based in Brooklyn